Crime After School (German: Verbrechen nach Schulschluß) is a 1959 West German drama film directed by Alfred Vohrer and starring Peter van Eyck, Christian Wolff and Heidi Brühl. It was based on a novel by Walter Ebert.

The film's sets were designed by the art directors Ellen Schmidt and Mathias Matthies. It was shot at the Wandsbek Studios in Hamburg.

Alfred Vohrer's 1975 film with the same title is not a remake.

Cast
 Peter van Eyck as Dr. Knittel 
 Christian Wolff as Fabian König 
 Heidi Brühl as Ulla Anders 
 Corny Collins as Viola von Eikelberg 
 Erica Beer as Erna Kallies 
 Alice Treff as Frau König 
 Elsa Wagner as Frau Teichen 
 Ingrid van Bergen as Königs Hausmädchen 
 Richard Münch as Oberst Dr. König 
 Bum Krüger as 1. Gerichtsdiener Willi Störtebecker 
 Joseph Offenbach as 2. Gerichtsdiener Hein 
 Günther Jerschke as Defense lawyer Dr. Baumriss 
 Claus Wilcke as Günther 'Bimbo' Steppe 
 Wolfgang Koch as Joachim 'Teddy' von Eikelberg 
 Jörg Holmer as Jürgen Richter 
 Walter Clemens as Horst Bregulla

References

Bibliography
 Bock, Hans-Michael & Bergfelder, Tim. The Concise CineGraph. Encyclopedia of German Cinema. Berghahn Books, 2009.
 Goble, Alan. The Complete Index to Literary Sources in Film. Walter de Gruyter, 1999.

External links 
 

1959 films
1959 drama films
German drama films
West German films
1950s German-language films
Films directed by Alfred Vohrer
Films shot at Wandsbek Studios
1950s German films